This is a list of listed buildings in Hillerød Municipality, Denmark.

The list

3400 Hillerød

3320 Skævinge

3480 Fredensborg

See also
 List of protected areas of Hillerød Municipality

References

External links

 Danish Agency of Culture

 
Hillerød